Hazzard House is a historic home located at Milton, Sussex County, Delaware. The original section dates to the 18th century, and is a two-story, three bay, single pile dwelling, of timber-frame construction on a brick foundation. It was expanded in the first half of the 19th century with a two-room, double pile addition.  It features a large verandah.  It was the home of Delaware Governor David Hazzard (1781-1864).

It was added to the National Register of Historic Places in 1973.  It is located in the Milton Historic District.

References

Houses on the National Register of Historic Places in Delaware
Houses in Sussex County, Delaware
National Register of Historic Places in Sussex County, Delaware
Individually listed contributing properties to historic districts on the National Register in Delaware